In mathematics, Lill's method is a visual method of finding the real roots of a univariate polynomial of any degree. It was developed by Austrian engineer Eduard Lill in 1867. A later paper by Lill dealt with the problem of complex roots.

Lill's method involves drawing a path of straight line segments making right angles, with lengths equal to the coefficients of the polynomial. The roots of the polynomial can then be found as the slopes of other right-angle paths, also connecting the start to the terminus, but with vertices on the lines of the first path.

Description of the method

To employ the method a diagram is drawn starting at the origin. A line segment is drawn rightwards by the magnitude of the first coefficient (the coefficient of the highest-power term)  (so that with a negative coefficient the segment will end left of the origin). From the end of the first segment another segment is drawn upwards by the magnitude of the second coefficient, then left by the magnitude of the third, and down by the magnitude of the fourth, and so on. The sequence of directions (not turns) is always rightward, upward, leftward, downward, then repeating itself. Thus each turn is counterclockwise. The process continues for every coefficient of the polynomial including zeroes, with negative coefficients "walking backwards". The final point reached, at the end of the segment corresponding to the equation's constant term, is the terminus.

A line is then launched from the origin at some angle , reflected off of each line segment at a right angle (not necessarily the "natural" angle of reflection), and refracted at a right angle through the line through each segment (including a line for the zero coefficients) when the angled path does not hit the line segment on that line. The vertical and horizontal lines are reflected off or refracted through in the following sequence: the line containing the segment corresponding to the coefficient of  then of  etc. For every real zero of the polynomial there will be one unique initial angle and path that will land on the terminus. A quadratic with two real roots, for example, will have exactly two angles that satisfy the above conditions.

For complex roots, one also needs to find a series of similar triangles, but with the vertices of the root path displaced from the polynomial path by a distance equal to the imaginary part of the root. In this case the root path will not be rectangular.

Explanation 
The construction in effect evaluates the polynomial according to Horner's method. For a root of the polynomial the final value is zero, so the last vertex coincides with the polynomial path terminus.

Additional properties 
A solution line giving a root is similar to the Lill's construction for the polynomial with that root removed, because the visual construction is analogous to the synthetic division of the polynomial by a linear (root) monic (Ruffini's rule).

From the symmetry of the diagram, it can easily be seen that the roots of the reversed polynomial are the reciprocals of the original roots. 

The construction can also be done using clockwise turns instead of counterclockwise turns. When a path is interpreted using the other convention, it corresponds to the mirrored polynomial (every odd coefficient sign changed) and the roots are negated.

When the right-angle path is traversed in the other direction but the same direction convention, it corresponds to the reversed mirrored polynomial and the roots are the negative reciprocals of the original roots.

Finding quadratic roots using Thales's theorem 

Lill's method can be used with Thales's theorem to find the real roots of a quadratic polynomial.

In this example with 3x2+5x−2, the polynomial's line segments are first drawn in black, as above. A circle is drawn with the straight line segment joining the start and end points forming a diameter.

According to Thales's theorem, the triangle containing these points and any other point on the circle is a right triangle. Intersects of this circle with the middle segment of Lill's method, extended if needed, thus define the two angled paths in Lill's method, coloured blue and red.

The negative of the gradients of their first segments, m, yield the real roots 1/3 and −2.

Finding roots using paper folding 

In 1936 Margherita Piazzola Beloch showed how Lill's method could be adapted to solve cubic equations using paper folding. If simultaneous folds are allowed then any nth degree equation with a real root can be solved using n–2 simultaneous folds.

In this example with 3x3+2x2−7x+2, the polynomial's line segments are first drawn on a sheet of paper (black). Lines passing through reflections of the start and end points in the second and third segments, respectively (faint circle and square), and parallel to the them (grey lines) are drawn.

For each root, the paper is folded until the start point (black circle) and end point (black square) are reflected onto these lines. The axis of reflection (dash-dot line) defines the angled path corresponding to the root (blue, purple and red). The negative of the gradients of their first segments, m, yield the real roots 1/3, 1 and −2.

See also 
Carlyle circle, which is based on a slightly modified version of Lill's method for a normed quadratic.

References

External links

 Animation for Lill's Method
 Mathologer video: "Solving equations by shooting turtles with lasers"

Geometry
Paper folding
Polynomials